Henry Pickering may refer to:

Sir Henry Pickering, 1st Baronet (died 1668), of the Pickering Baronets
Sir Henry Pickering, 2nd Baronet (c. 1656–1705), English politician
Henry Pickering (artist), (active c.1745-d.1771) English portrait painter

See also